The Kwaami language, also known as Komawa, Kwam, Kwamanchi, Kwami, or Kwom, is a West Chadic language spoken in Bauchi State, Nigeria, near the city of Gombe.

References

West Chadic languages
Languages of Nigeria